Tex Holdings plc is a United Kingdom-based manufacturer and supplier of engineering products, piling equipment, plastic injection moulding, and boards and panels. The company is listed on the FTSE Fledgling Index of the London Stock Exchange under the ticker TXH in the industrial engineering sector.

References

External links 
http://www.tex-holdings.co.uk/

Companies listed on the London Stock Exchange